Lemuel ( Ləmū’ēl, "to him, El") is the name of a biblical king mentioned in Proverbs 31:1 and 4, but whose identity remains uncertain. Speculation exists and proposes that Lemuel might have been king of Massa, while some identified him with Hezekiah or Solomon.

Name
The name is related to Lael found in Numbers 3:24 meaning a man consecrated "to God". In etymological form the name Lemuel is kindred with Jamuel (Genesis 46:10) and Namuel (1 Chronicles 4:24).

Biblical passage
The opening verse of Proverbs 31 reads: "The words of Lemuel, king; a vision with which his mother diverted him." The name occurs again in verse 4: "It is not for kings, Lemuel, not for kings to drink wine". The discourse, which is an exhortation to chastity, justice, mercy and temperance, appears to end with verse 9, but might continue through the end of the book. Nothing else is found in scriptures concerning Lemuel aside from these two mentions in beginning of Proverbs 31. Jewish legend identifies him as Solomon, taking this advice from his mother Bathsheba; but there is no clear evidence for this. 

The widely used Strong's Concordance, a reference work that assigns a unique reference number to every Biblical Hebrew word and its English translation, states that Lemuel is Hebrew word 3927, related to words 3926 and 410 and means "(belonging) to God; Lemuel or Lemoel, a symbolic name of Solomon: -Lemuel".  Other Bible commentators concur with Strong's: Easton's Bible Dictionary, Hitchcock's Bible Names, Smith's Bible Dictionary and Nave's Topical Bible. Rashi identifies the portmanteau as meaning "to him, G-d" more literally, as in "[the king] to whom G-d [spoke]." 

The passage seems to be the one direct address to a king in the Book of Proverbs – something that was the norm in wisdom literature of the ancient world.

Solomon had numerous wives and concubines. Solomon's mother was Bathsheba, which may mean she is the author of the "inspired utterance" of this section of Proverbs. Many commentators typically divide Chapter 31 of Proverbs into two distinct, unrelated sections. Verses 1–9 are directly directed to King Lemuel while Proverbs 31:10–28 describe the virtuous (noble) woman.
 
Some modern scholars understand "מַ֝שָּׂ֗א" (masa or massa), as a proper noun and not a word meaning "vision", and render the first passage thus: "The words of Lemuel, King of Masa (Assyria)".

New Testament

References

Attribution

Monarchs of the Hebrew Bible
Book of Proverbs
Solomon
Ancient Arabs